Lewis County High School (LCHS) is a public grade 9-12 high school located in Vanceburg, Kentucky. The school is operated by Lewis County Schools and is the sole public high school for Lewis County, Kentucky with a population of 13,870.

School demographics 
The demographic breakdown of the 688 students enrolled during the 2018-2019 was:

 Male - 50.7%
 Female - 49.3%
 White - 96.1%
 Two of More Races - 2.5%
 Hispanic or Latino - 0.9%
 Other - 0.5%

68.8% of the student body were considered economically disadvantaged.

Athletics 
Students at Lewis County High School have the opportunity to participate in variety of different athletic programs including:

 Football
 Golf 
 Volleyball
 Track and Field
 Basketball
 Baseball
 Softball
 Tennis

Among its athletics programs many accomplishment include their 1978 football team's perfect season.

The Lady Lions softball team has won back-to-back 16th region championships in 2021 and 2022 along with three straight 63rd district championships in 2019, 2021, and 2022.  No tournament held in 2020.

References 

Public high schools in Kentucky
Schools in Lewis County, Kentucky